Richard Courtney Stanhope (born 27 April 1957) in Blackpool, Lancashire, England is a male retired  British rower.

Rowing career
Stanhope competed in four Olympic Games; the 1980 Summer Olympics, 1984 Summer Olympics, 1988 Summer Olympics and 1992 Summer Olympics. At the 1980 Olympics he was a crew member of the British boat which won the silver medal in the 1980 Olympic eights event. Four years later he and his partner John Beattie finished twelfth in the 1984 coxless pairs competition and at the 1988 Games he finished fourth with the British boat in the men's eight contest. His final Olympic appearance was in 1992 when he was part of the British boat which finished seventh in the coxless four event at the Barcelona Games.

He represented England and won a silver medal in the eight, at the 1986 Commonwealth Games in Edinburgh, Scotland.

References

1957 births
Living people
English male rowers
British male rowers
Olympic rowers of Great Britain
Rowers at the 1980 Summer Olympics
Rowers at the 1984 Summer Olympics
Rowers at the 1988 Summer Olympics
Rowers at the 1992 Summer Olympics
Olympic silver medallists for Great Britain
Stewards of Henley Royal Regatta
Olympic medalists in rowing
Medalists at the 1980 Summer Olympics
Commonwealth Games medallists in rowing
Commonwealth Games silver medallists for England
World Rowing Championships medalists for Great Britain
Rowers at the 1986 Commonwealth Games
Medallists at the 1986 Commonwealth Games